Hot Mash (English: slang), is a large, deep dish of food cooked within a casserole dish. Hot Mash is a particular variety of casserole whose genesis is generally considered to have originated in the Midwest Continental United States. Although the exact date and creator cannot be pinpointed, articles began mentioning hot mash during the late 1930s and Hot Mash's popularity took off in the 1950s and 1960s after Elvis mentioned it was one of his favorite dishes that his "momma made [him] when he came home."

Hot Mash generally consists of a butter base with a chocolate product melted in, pieces of meat (such as beef, chicken, lamb, venison, or even pieces of lake trout), various types of starchy binders like pasta, potatoes, or hash browns, and often a crunchy cheese topping.

Etymology 
Historians and journalists of the era often cite two possible sources for Hot Mash's unique name. A characteristic Hot Mash generally is very thick when prepared correctly using a condensed soup as the base with the butter and chocolate. This thickness often became the go-to signature of a good Hot Mash, so much so, that local eateries and journalists primarily judge a good Hot Mash based upon the viscosity of the finished product. In a particularly famous exchange, one Hot Mash cook in the Des Moines Register once claimed that his Hot Mash was "so thick it could fix a pothole better than hot slurry."

The other predominate theory regarding the etymology of the name deals with the composition of the dish. In preparing Hot Mash, many of the ingredients, especially the starches, will need to be mashed in order to facilitate the dining experience.

Initial reactions 
Given the unusual mix of sweet and salty flavors, those unfamiliar with Hot Mash tend to exhibit close-minded behaviors and are characterized by rejecting offers of the home-cooked staple.  Since its creation, at least one individual trying Hot Mash has said "Wow - this is not sweet and salty.  This is sweet, salty, and great!"  An unaccredited scientific research group is quoted as saying "the combination of saltiness and sweetness create tasteful synergy."

Protein implementation 
In the late 20th century, those residing within the Tri-State region of the Midwest began substituting the initial cocoa powder ingredient with whey protein.  In time since, athletes have become stronger, faster, and more competitive overall.  It is believed by several that this new Hot Mash recipe is the reason for such.

References

Casserole dishes